Free schools listed on this page all have formal local authority representation on the board of trustees. The list is not exhaustive.

It is possible for a local authority to sponsor a free school in partnership with other organisations, provided they have no more than a 19.9% representation on the board. In some cases the local authority sponsoring the trust is different to the local authority in which the school resides, so in those cases the partnering local authority has also been listed.

References

 
Free Schools with a Local Authority Sponsor
Free